The Sketch Process is the second EP by The Friday Night Boys. It was released on April 15, 2008 and produced by Sean Small.

Track listing

2008 EPs
The Friday Night Boys albums